The Dam Busters is a 1955 British epic war film starring Richard Todd and Michael Redgrave. It was directed by Michael Anderson. The film recreates the true story of Operation Chastise when in 1943 the RAF's 617 Squadron attacked the Möhne, Eder, and Sorpe dams in Nazi Germany with Barnes Wallis's bouncing bomb.

The film was based on the books The Dam Busters (1951) by Paul Brickhill and Enemy Coast Ahead (1946) by Guy Gibson. The film's reflective last minutes convey the poignant mix of emotions felt by the characters – triumph over striking a successful blow against the enemy's industrial base is tempered by the sobering knowledge that many died in the process of delivering it.

The film was widely praised and became the most popular motion picture at British cinemas in 1955. In 1999, the British Film Institute voted The Dam Busters the 68th greatest British film of the 20th century. Its depiction of the raid, along with a similar sequence in the film 633 Squadron, provided the inspiration for the Death Star trench run in Star Wars.

A remake has been in development since 2008, but has yet to be produced .

Plot
In early 1942, aeronautical engineer Barnes Wallis is struggling to develop a means of attacking Germany's dams in the hope of crippling German heavy industry. Working for the Ministry of Aircraft Production, as well as his own job at Vickers, he works feverishly to make practical his theory of a bouncing bomb which would skip over the water to avoid protective torpedo nets. When it hit the dam, backspin would make it sink whilst retaining contact with the wall, making the explosion far more destructive. Wallis calculates that the aircraft will have to fly extremely low to enable the bombs to skip over the water correctly, but when he takes his conclusions to the Ministry, he is told that lack of production capacity means they cannot go ahead with his proposals.

Angry and frustrated, Wallis secures an interview with Sir Arthur "Bomber" Harris (played by Basil Sydney), the head of RAF Bomber Command, who at first is reluctant to take the idea seriously. Eventually, however, he is convinced and takes the idea to the Prime Minister, who authorises the project.

Bomber Command forms a special squadron of Lancaster bombers, 617 Squadron, to be commanded by Wing Commander Guy Gibson, and tasked to fly the mission. He recruits experienced crews, especially those with low-altitude flight experience. While they train for the mission, Wallis continues his development of the bomb but has problems, such as the bomb breaking apart upon hitting the water. With only a few weeks to go, he succeeds in fixing the problems and the mission can go ahead.

The bombers attack the dams. Eight Lancasters and their crews are lost, but two dams are breached and the overall mission succeeds. Wallis later encounters Gibson, clearly affected by the loss of the crewmen, but Gibson stresses the squadron knew what they were facing but they went in regardless of the odds. Before they part Wallis asks if Gibson will finally get some sleep. Gibson says he cannot; he has to write letters to the dead airmen's next of kin.

Cast

In credits order.

 Richard Todd as Wing Commander  Guy Gibson, CO of 617 Squadron and pilot of "George"
 Michael Redgrave as Barnes Wallis, assistant chief designer, Aviation Section, Vickers-Armstrong Ltd
 Ursula Jeans as Mrs Molly Wallis
 Basil Sydney as Air Chief Marshal  Sir Arthur Harris, GOC-in-C, RAF Bomber Command
 Patrick Barr as Captain Joseph "Mutt" Summers, Chief Test Pilot, Vickers-Armstrong Ltd
 Ernest Clark as Air Vice-Marshal Ralph Cochrane, AOC, No. 5 Group RAF
 Derek Farr as Group Captain John Whitworth, station commander, RAF Scampton
 Charles Carson as Doctor
 Stanley Van Beers as David Pye, director of scientific research, Air Ministry
 Colin Tapley as Dr William Glanville, director of Road Research, Department of Scientific and Industrial Research
 Frederick Leister as committee member
 Eric Messiter as committee member
 Laidman Browne as committee member
 Raymond Huntley as National Physical Laboratory Official
 Hugh Manning as Ministry of Aircraft Production Official
 Edwin Styles as Observer at Trials
 Hugh Moxey as Observer at Trials
 Anthony Shaw as RAF Officer at Trials
 Laurence Naismith as Farmer
 Harold Siddons as Group Signals Officer
 Frank Phillips as BBC Announcer
 Brewster Mason as Flight Lieutenant Richard Trevor-Roper, rear gunner of "George"
 Anthony Doonan as Flight Lieutenant Robert Hutchison, wireless operator of "George"
 Nigel Stock as Flying Officer Frederick Spafford, bomb aimer of "George"
 Brian Nissen as Flight Lieutenant Torger Taerum, navigator of "George"
 Robert Shaw as Flight Sergeant John Pulford, flight engineer of "George"
 Peter Assinder as Pilot Officer Andrew Deering, front gunner of "George"
 Richard Leech as Squadron Leader Melvin "Dinghy" Young, pilot of "Apple"
 Richard Thorp as Squadron Leader Henry Maudslay, pilot of "Zebra"
 John Fraser as Flight Lieutenant John Hopgood, pilot of "Mother"
 David Morrell as Flight Lieutenant Bill Astell, pilot of "Baker"
 Bill Kerr as Flight Lieutenant H. B. "Micky" Martin, pilot of "Popsie"
 George Baker as Flight Lieutenant David Maltby, pilot of "Johnny"
 Ronald Wilson as Flight Lieutenant Dave Shannon, pilot of "Leather"
 Denys Graham as Flying Officer Les Knight, pilot of "Nancy"
 Basil Appleby as Flight Lieutenant Bob Hay, bomb aimer of "Popsie"
 Tim Turner as Flight Lieutenant Jack Leggo, navigator of "Popsie"
 Ewen Solon as Flight Sergeant G. E. Powell, crew chief
 Harold Goodwin as Gibson's batman
 Peter Arne (uncredited) as Staff Officer to Air-Vice Marshal Cochrane
 Edward Cast (uncredited) as Crew Member
 Richard Coleman (uncredited) as RAF Officer
 Brenda de Banzie (uncredited) as Waitress
 Peter Diamond (uncredited) as Tail Gunner
 Gerald Harper (uncredited) as RAF Officer
 Arthur Howard (uncredited) as RAF Pay Clerk in NAAFI
 Lloyd Lamble (uncredited) as Collins
 Philip Latham (uncredited) as Flight Sergeant
 Patrick McGoohan (uncredited) as RAF Security Guard 
 Edwin Richfield (uncredited) as RAF Officer
 Elisabeth Gaunt (Barnes Wallis's daughter in real life) as photographer in the test tank

Development
Following the success of the book The Dam Busters (a RAF-approved history of 617 Squadron), Robert Clark the head of production at Associated British Picture Corporation (ABPC) approached its author Paul Brickhill about acquiring the film rights as a vehicle for Richard Todd. The company's production manager was, however, of the opinion that, due to its numerous personnel and raids, it would not be able to film the book in its entirety. As a result, Clark requested that Brickhill provide a film treatment which described his vision for the film. Brickhill agreed to do it without payment in the hope of selling the film rights. To assist him, Clark teamed him up with Walter Mycroft who was the company's director of production. Brickhill decided to concentrate the film treatment on Operation Chastise and ignore the later raids.

After the Air Ministry agreed to make available four Lancaster bombers at a cheap price which helped make the production viable, Associated British decided to proceed with the film and agreed with Brickhill on the film rights in December 1952 for what is believed to have been £5,000. After considering C.S. Forester, Terence Rattigan, as well as Emlyn Williams and Leslie Arliss, R. C. Sherriff was selected as the screenwriter with planned August delivery of the screenplay. Sherriff agreed with Brickhill's opinion that the film needed to concentrate on Operation Chastise and exclude the later operations covered in the book.

In preparation for writing the script, Sherriff met with Barnes Wallis at his home, later returning accompanied by Brickhill, Walter Mycroft and production supervisor W.A. "Bill" Whittaker on 22 March 1952 to witness Wallis demonstrating his original home experiment. To Wallis's embarrassment he couldn't get it to work, no matter how many times he tried.

Just prior to the film's scheduled release, Guy Gibson's widow Eve took legal action to prevent it, and Brickhill and Clark were mired in months of wrangling with her until references to her husband's book Enemy Coast Ahead were included.

Production
The flight sequences of the film were shot using real Avro Lancaster bombers supplied by the RAF. The aircraft, four of the final production B.VIIs, had to be taken out of storage and specially modified by removing the mid-upper gun turrets to mimic 617 Squadron's special aircraft, and cost £130 per hour to run, which amounted to a tenth of the film's costs. A number of Avro Lincoln bombers were also used as "set dressing". (An American cut was made more dramatic by depicting an aircraft flying into a hill and exploding. This version used stock footage from Warner Brothers of a Boeing B-17 Flying Fortress, not a Lancaster.)

The Upper Derwent Valley in Derbyshire (the test area for the real raids) doubled as the Ruhr valley for the film. The scene where the Dutch coast is crossed was filmed between Boston, Lincolnshire, and King's Lynn, Norfolk, and other coastal scenes near Skegness. The scene where they fly along a canal was filmed on the Dutch river (local nickname for the canal) on the way to Goole which is on the M62 to Hull. As the planes turn across country you can see Goole fully as they turn. This was used as the area around Goole is perfectly flat. Additional aerial footage was shot above Windermere, in the Lake District.

While RAF Scampton, where the real raid launched, was used for some scenes, the principal airfield used for ground location shooting was RAF Hemswell, a few miles north and still an operational RAF station at the time of filming. Guy Gibson had been based at Hemswell in his final posting and the airfield had been an operational Avro Lancaster base during the war. At the time filming took place it was then home to No. 109 Squadron and No. 139 Squadron RAF, which were both operating English Electric Canberras on electronic countermeasures and nuclear air sampling missions over hydrogen bomb test sites in the Pacific and Australia. However, part of the RAF's fleet of ageing Avro Lincolns had been mothballed at Hemswell prior to being broken up and several of these static aircraft appeared in background shots during filming, doubling for additional No 617 Squadron Lancasters. The station headquarters building still stands on what is now an industrial estate and is named Gibson House. The four wartime hangars also still stand, little changed in external appearance since the war.

Serving RAF pilots from both squadrons based at Hemswell took turns flying the Lancasters during filming and found the close formation and low level flying around Derwentwater and Windermere exhilarating and a welcome change from their normal high level solo Canberra sorties.

Three of the four Lancaster bombers used in the film had also appeared in the Dirk Bogarde film Appointment in London two years earlier.

The theatre scene showing the spotlights was filmed at the Lyric Theatre Hammersmith.  The dance troupe was The Television Toppers, on loan for one day filming, under contract from the BBC. The singer was June Powell, she sings the 1942 song "Sing Everybody Sing" by John P Long.

The film featured several actors who would go on to be stars of cinema and TV. Robert Shaw was featured as Gibson's engineer Flt Sgt Pulford while George Baker played Flt Lt Maltby. Patrick McGoohan had a bit part as a security guard, standing guard outside the briefing room. He delivered the line—"Sorry, old boy, it's secret—you can't go in. Now, c'mon, hop it!", which was cut from some prints of the film. Richard Thorp played Sqn Ldr Maudslay.

Soundtrack

The Dam Busters March, by Eric Coates, is for many synonymous with the film, as well as with the exploit itself, and remains a favourite military band item at flypasts and in the concert hall.

Other than the introduction and trio section theme, the majority of the march as performed is not featured in the film soundtrack. Coates himself avoided writing music for the cinema, remembering the experiences of his fellow composer Arthur Bliss. Coates only agreed to provide an overture for the film after he was persuaded by the film's producers it was of "national importance" and pressure was put on him via his publisher, Chappell. A march he had recently completed was found to fit well with the heroic subject and was thus submitted. The majority of the soundtrack including the theme played during the raid sequence in the film was composed by Leighton Lucas.

Philip Lane, who reconstructed parts of Leighton Lucas's orchestral score (which had been lost) notes that Lucas created his own main theme "which seems to play hide and seek with Coates’s throughout the film, both vying for supremacy."

Censorship 
Gibson had a dog called Nigger, a black Labrador which was the mascot of No. 617 Squadron. Gibson owned the dog when he was previously a member of 106 Squadron. Nigger often accompanied Gibson on training flights and was a great favourite of the members of both 106 and 617 Squadrons. He was noted for his liking of beer, which he drank from his own bowl in the Officers' Mess.

Nigger died on 16 May 1943, the day of the "Dam Busters" raid, when he was hit by a car. He was buried at midnight as Gibson was leading the raid. The dog's name was used as a single codeword whose transmission conveyed that the Möhne Dam had been breached. In the film, the dog was portrayed in several scenes; his name and the codeword were mentioned several times. Some of these scenes were sampled in the film Pink Floyd – The Wall (1982).

In 1999, British television network ITV broadcast a censored version of the film, removing all utterances of "Nigger". ITV blamed regional broadcaster London Weekend Television, which in turn alleged that a junior staff member had been responsible for the unauthorised cuts. When ITV again showed a censored version in June 2001, it was condemned by the Index on Censorship as "unnecessary and ridiculous" and because the edits introduced continuity errors. The British Channel 4 screened the censored American version in July 2007, in which the dialogue was dubbed so as to call the dog "Trigger", this screening took place just after the planned remake was announced. In September 2007, as part of the BBC Summer of British Film series, The Dam Busters was shown at selected cinemas across the UK in its uncut format. The original, uncensored, version was also shown on 1 and 5 January 2013, by Channel 5. It was the version, distributed by StudioCanal, containing shots of the bomber flying into a hill.

In 2020, Film 4 broadcast an edited version, possibly re-dubbed in a few places, where the dog's name is removed, addressed as "old boy" or referred to as "my dog".

Historical accuracy

The film is largely historically accurate, with only a small number of changes made for reasons of dramatic licence. Some errors derive from Paul Brickhill's book, which was written when much detail about the raid was not yet in the public domain.
 Barnes Wallis said that he never encountered any opposition from bureaucracy. In the film, when a reluctant official asks what he can possibly say to the RAF to persuade them to lend a Vickers Wellington bomber for flight testing the bomb, Wallis suggests: "Well, if you told them that I designed it, do you think that might help?" Barnes Wallis was heavily involved with the design of the Wellington, as it used his geodetic airframe construction method, though he was not actually its chief designer.
 Instead of all of Gibson's tour-expired crew at 106 Squadron volunteering to follow him to his new command, only his wireless operator, Hutchinson, went with him to 617 Squadron.
 Rather than the purpose as well as the method of the raid being Wallis's sole idea, the dams had already been identified as an important target by the Air Ministry before the war.
 Gibson did not devise the spotlights altimeter after visiting a theatre; it was suggested by Benjamin Lockspeiser of the Ministry of Aircraft Production after Gibson requested they solve the problem. It was a proven method used by RAF Coastal Command aircraft for some time.
 The wooden "coat hanger" bomb sight intended to enable crews to release the weapon at the right distance from the target was not wholly successful; some crews used it, but others came up with their own solutions, such as pieces of string in the bomb-aimer's position and/or markings on the blister.
 No bomber flew into a hillside near a target on the actual raid. This scene, which is not in the original version, was included in the copy released on the North American market (see above). Three bombers are brought down by enemy fire and two crashed due to hitting power lines in the valleys.
 Some of the sequences showing the testing of Upkeep—the code name for the weapon—in the film are of Mosquito fighter-bombers dropping the naval version of the bouncing bomb, code-named Highball, intended to be used against ships. This version of the weapon was never used operationally.
 At the time the film was made, certain aspects of Upkeep were still held classified, so the actual test footage was censored to hide any details of the test bombs (a black dot was superimposed over the bomb on each frame), and the dummy bombs carried by the Lancasters were almost spherical but with flat sides rather than the true cylindrical shape.
 The dummy bomb did not show the mechanism which created the back spin.
 Ammunition shown being loaded into a Lancaster is .50 calibre for M2 Browning heavy machine guns, not that for the .303 calibre machine guns found on the Lancaster in 1943.
 The scenes of the attack on the Eder Dam show a castle resembling Schloss Waldeck on the wrong side of the lake and dam. The position and angle of the lake in relation to the castle suggest that in reality the bombing-run would have needed a downhill approach to the west of the castle.
 Wallis states that his idea came from Nelson's bouncing cannonballs into the sides of enemy ships. (He also states that Nelson sank one ship during the Battle of the Nile with a yorker, a cricket term for a ball that bounces under the bat, making it difficult to play.) There is no evidence for this claim. In a 1942 paper, Wallis mentioned the bouncing of cannonballs in the 16th and 17th centuries, but Nelson was not mentioned.
 In the film Wallis (Redgrave) tells Gibson and Young that a mechanical problem with the release gear has been solved as the engineers had the correct oil in store. This is false; there was a technical problem which was solved by Sgt Charles Sackville-Bryant, who was awarded the BEM for this.

Release
The Dambusters received a Royal world premiere at the Empire, Leicester Square on 16 May 1955, the twelfth anniversary of the raid. Princess Margaret attended along with Eve Gibson, Guy Gibson's widow and his father. Richard Todd, Barnes Wallis and the surviving members of 617 Squadron who had taken part in the mission were all guests of honour. The premiere helped to raise money and awareness for various RAF charities.

The film was not shown on British television until 30 May 1971.

Reception

Critical
Reviews upon its release were positive. Variety described the film as having great attention to detail.

Over time, the film's reputation has grown and is now regarded as a beloved classic of British cinema. The British Film Institute placed The Dam Busters as the 68th greatest British film. In 2004, the magazine Total Film named The Dam Busters the 43rd greatest British film of all time. In a 2015 review, The Guardian stated that The Dam Busters remains very well made and entertaining. The film holds a 100% rating with an average rating of 7.9/10 on Rotten Tomatoes, based on 11 reviews.

Richard Todd considered the film as one of his favourites of all those that he appeared in, and went on to appear at many Dambusters themed events.

Awards
The film was nominated for an Oscar for Best Special Effects, and was also nominated for BAFTA awards for Best British Film, Best Screenplay and Best Film From Any Source.

Box office
The film was the most successful film at the British box office in 1955 but performed poorly at the US box office, like most British war movies of this era.

Legacy
On 16 May 2008, a commemoration of the 65th anniversary was held at Derwent Reservoir, including a flypast by a Lancaster, Spitfire, and Hurricane. The event was attended by actor Richard Todd, representing the film crew and Les Munro, the last surviving pilot from the original raid, as well as Mary Stopes-Roe, the elder daughter of Sir Barnes Wallis.

On 17 May 2018, a commemoration of the 75th anniversary was held, in which a restored version of the film was broadcast live from the Royal Albert Hall, and hosted by Dan Snow. The film was simulcast into over 300 cinemas nationwide.

Remake
Work on a remake of The Dam Busters, produced by Peter Jackson and directed by Christian Rivers, began in 2008. Jackson said in the mid-1990s that he became interested in remaking the 1955 film, but found that the rights had been bought by Mel Gibson. In 2004, Jackson was contacted by his agent, who said Gibson had dropped the rights. In December 2005, the rights were purchased by Sir David Frost, from the Brickhill family. Stephen Fry wrote the script.

In March 2007, it was announced it would be distributed by Universal Pictures in North America, and StudioCanal, the corporate heir to ABPC, in the rest of the world. Filming was planned to commence in early 2009, on a budget of US$40 million, although no project-specific filming had begun by May 2009. The project was delayed because Jackson decided to make The Hobbit.

Weta Workshop was making the models and special effects for the film and had made 10 life-size Lancaster bombers. Fry said Wing Commander Guy Gibson's dog "Nigger" will be called "Digger" in the remake to avoid rekindled controversy over the original name. For the remake, Peter Jackson has said no decision has been made on the dog's name, but is in a "no-win, damned-if-you-do-and-damned-if-you-don't scenario", as changing the name could be seen as too much political correctness, while not changing the name could offend people. Further, executive producer Sir David Frost was quoted in The Independent as stating: "Guy sometimes used to call his dog Nigsy, so I think that's what we will call it. Stephen has been coming up with other names, but this is the one I want." Les Munro, a pilot in the strike team, joined the production crew in Masterton as technical advisor. Jackson was also to use newly declassified War Office documents to ensure the authenticity of the film.

After Munro died in August 2015, Phil Bonner of the Lincolnshire Aviation Heritage Centre said he still thinks Jackson will eventually make the film, citing Jackson's passion for aviation. Jackson said, "There is only a limited span I can abide, of people driving me nuts asking me when I’m going to do that project. So I’ll have to do it. I want to, actually, it’s one of the truly great true stories of the Second World War, a wonderful, wonderful story."

In late 2018, news emerged that Jackson was to begin production on the film once again. He intended for production to commence soon, as he only had the film rights for "another year or two".

In popular culture
 The attack on the Death Star in the climax of the film Star Wars is a deliberate and acknowledged homage to the climactic sequence of The Dam Busters. In the former film, rebel pilots have to fly through a trench while evading enemy fire and fire a proton torpedo at a precise distance from the target to destroy the entire base with a single explosion; if one run fails, another run must be made by a different pilot. In addition to the similarity of the scenes, some of the dialogue is nearly identical. Star Wars also ends with an Elgarian march, like The Dam Busters. The same may be said of 633 Squadron, in which a squadron of de Havilland Mosquitos must drop a bomb on a rock overhanging a key German factory at the end of a Norwegian fjord. Gilbert Taylor, responsible for special effects photography on The Dam Busters, was the director of photography for Star Wars.
 In the 1982 film Pink Floyd The Wall, scenes from The Dam Busters can be seen and heard playing on a television set several times during the film. Particular emphasis is placed on scenes in the film where characters mention Nigger, Guy Gibson's Labrador. "The reason that The Dam Busters is in the film version of The Wall," explained the Floyd's Roger Waters, "is because I'm from that generation who grew up in postwar Britain, and all those movies were very important to us. The Dam Busters was my favourite of all of them. It's so stuffed with great characters." Waters had previously introduced the band's song 'Echoes' at live shows as 'March of the Dam Busters'.
 The 1973 film The Goodies and the Beanstalk incorporates a scene where the eponymous heroes take cover and are attacked by geese dropping golden eggs. To the Dambusters March tune, one of the eggs bounces several times before exploding against the wall behind which they have hidden.
 The 1984 video game The Dam Busters was partially based on the film.
 Two television advertisements were made for a brand of beer, Carling Black Label, which played on the theme of The Dam Busters. Both were made before the English football team broke a 35-year losing streak against Germany. The first showed a German guard on top of a dam catching a number of bouncing bombs as if he were a goalkeeper. The second showed a British tourist throwing a Union Flag towel which skipped off the water like a bouncing bomb to reserve a pool-side seat before the German tourists could reserve them with their towels. Both actions were followed by the comment "I bet he drinks Carling Black Label". The adverts were criticised by the Independent Television Commission, although UK newspaper The Independent reported "a spokeswoman for the German embassy in London dismissed the idea that Germans might find the commercial offensive, adding: 'I find it very amusing'".

See also
 BFI Top 100 British films

References

Notes

Citations

Bibliography

 Dando-Collins, Stephen. The Hero Maker: A Biography of Paul Brickhill. Sydney, Australia: Penguin Random House Australia, 2016. .
 Dolan, Edward F. Jr. Hollywood Goes to War. London: Bison Books, 1985. .
 Garbett, Mike and Brian Goulding. The Lancaster at War. Toronto: Musson Book Company, 1971. .
 Kaminski, Michael. The Secret History of Star Wars. Kingston, Ontario, Canada: Legacy Books Press, 2008, First edition 2007. .

Further reading
 Ramsden, John. The Dam Busters: A British Film Guide. London: I.B. Tauris & Co., 2003. .

External links
 
 
 
 May 2003 article in The Guardian revisiting the actual sites of the film, and testifying to the iconic status of The Dam Busters March
 "The Dam-Busters" a 1954 Flight article on the making of the film
 "A Triumphant British Picture" a 1955 Flight review of The Dam Busters film by Bill Gunston

1955 films
1955 war films
British black-and-white films
British war films
British World War II films
British aviation films
Films shot at Associated British Studios
1950s English-language films
Films based on multiple works
Films based on works by Paul Brickhill
Films directed by Michael Anderson
Films set in England
Films set in Lincolnshire
Films set in Germany
Films shot in Cumbria
Films shot in Derbyshire
Films shot in Lincolnshire
Royal Air Force mass media
World War II aviation films
World War II films based on actual events
Films set in 1943
Associated British Picture Corporation
1950s British films